Chongor-e Jalilvand (also Romanized as Chongor-e Jalīlvand; also known as Changar, Changezeh, Chengoreh, Chongoreh-ye Jalīlvand, Chongoreh-ye Sīmīvand, Chownger, and Chowngor) is a village in Howmeh-ye Shomali Rural District, in the Central District of Eslamabad-e Gharb County, Kermanshah Province, Iran. At the 2006 census, its population was 823, in 164 families.

References 

Populated places in Eslamabad-e Gharb County